Haramiyavia is a genus of synapsid in the clade Haramiyida that existed about 200 million years ago in the Rhaetian stage of the Triassic. Like other haramiyidans, it was likely a non-mammalian mammaliaform. It contains a single species, H. clemmenseni from the Fleming Fjord Formation of Greenland, and has been assigned to the monogeneric family Haramiyaviidae.

Biology
A study involving Mesozoic mammaliaform dietary habits ranks it among insectivorous taxa.

References

Haramiyida
Rhaetian life
Late Triassic synapsids
Triassic Greenland
Fossils of Greenland
Fossil taxa described in 1997
Triassic synapsids of North America
Prehistoric cynodont genera